Balnica  (Bal’nytsia) is a former village in the administrative district of Gmina Komańcza, within Sanok County, in the Subcarpathian Voivodeship (province) of south-eastern Poland, close to the border with Slovakia.

The village, which was populated by Ukrainians, ceased to exist after the 1944–46 population exchange between Poland and Soviet Ukraine.

See also
Komancza Republic (November 1918 – January 1919)

References

External links

Balnica